Guntis Osis (born 30 October 1962 in Talsi) is a Latvian Soviet bobsledder who competed in the late 1980s. He won the bronze medal in the four-man event at the 1988 Winter Olympics in Calgary.

References

External links
 
 

1962 births
Living people
People from Talsi
Latvian male bobsledders
Soviet male bobsledders
Olympic bobsledders of the Soviet Union
Olympic bobsledders of Latvia
Olympic bronze medalists for the Soviet Union
Olympic medalists in bobsleigh
Bobsledders at the 1988 Winter Olympics
Medalists at the 1988 Winter Olympics